Dino Marcan and Tristan-Samuel Weissborn were the defending champions but chose not to defend their title.

Félix Auger-Aliassime and Nicola Kuhn won the title after defeating Marin and Tomislav Draganja 2–6, 6–2, [11–9] in the final.

Seeds

Draw

References
 Main Draw

Hungarian Challenger Open - Doubles